Néstor Fabián Pías Torres (born March 7, 1981 in Montevideo) is a Uruguayan track and road cyclist.

Major results

2000
 1st Overall Vuelta Ciclista de la Juventud
2004
 5th Overall Vuelta del Uruguay
1st Stage 3
2005
 1st Stage 8 Rutas de América
 5th Overall Vuelta del Uruguay
 8th Time trial, Pan American Road Championships
2006
 1st Overall Vuelta del Uruguay
1st Stage 4
 2nd Overall Vuelta al Chana
 6th Overall Vuelta Ciclista de Chile
2008
 1st Stage 8 Rutas de América
 2nd Overall Vuelta del Uruguay
 3rd Overall Prueba CC Champagnat Sprinter
 3rd Apertura Temporada del Uruguay
 5th Overall Tour Canario
1st Stage 2
2009
 4th Overall Rutas de América
 4th Overall Volta de Ciclismo Internacional do Estado de São Paulo
2011
 2nd Overall Rutas de América
1st Stage 2
2012
 6th Overall Vuelta del Uruguay
2013
 National Road Championships
2nd Time trial
2nd Road race
2014
 1st  Time trial, National Road Championships
2015
 1st  Time trial, National Road Championships
 6th Overall Vuelta del Uruguay
2016
 1st Overall Vuelta del Uruguay
1st Stages 3a (TTT) & 7 (ITT)
2017
 9th Overall Vuelta del Uruguay

External links

 

1981 births
Living people
Uruguayan male cyclists
Sportspeople from Montevideo